West Bolton (officially Bolton-Ouest) is a municipality located in the Brome-Missisquoi Regional County Municipality of the Estrie administrative region of Quebec, Canada. The population as of the Canada 2021 Census was 732.

Demographics

Population
Population trend:

Language
Mother tongue language (2021)

See also
List of municipalities in Quebec
 Bolton-Est, Quebec

References

External links

Official site

Municipalities in Quebec
Incorporated places in Brome-Missisquoi Regional County Municipality